Matt Jones (born 18 October 1987) is a former professional Australian rules footballer who played for the Melbourne Football Club in the Australian Football League (AFL). He was recruited by the club with 53rd selection in the 2012 national draft after playing for South Croydon and Box Hill. He made his debut in round 1, 2013, against  at the Melbourne Cricket Ground. He was delisted at the conclusion of the 2016 season.

Statistics

|- style="background-color: #EAEAEA"
! scope="row" style="text-align:center" | 2013
|style="text-align:center;"|
| 45 || 22 || 3 || 4 || 216 || 208 || 424 || 91 || 59 || 0.1 || 0.2 || 9.8 || 9.5 || 19.3 || 4.1 || 2.7
|-
! scope="row" style="text-align:center" | 2014
|style="text-align:center;"|
| 45 || 20 || 3 || 4 || 213 || 168 || 381 || 98 || 53 || 0.2 || 0.2 || 10.7 || 8.4 || 19.1 || 4.9 || 2.7
|- style="background-color: #EAEAEA"
! scope="row" style="text-align:center" | 2015
|style="text-align:center;"|
| 45 || 9 || 4 || 2 || 48 || 45 || 93 || 25 || 25 || 0.4 || 0.2 || 5.3 || 5.0 || 10.3 || 2.8 || 2.8
|-
! scope="row" style="text-align:center" | 2016
|style="text-align:center;"|
| 45 || 10 || 1 || 0 || 99 || 106 || 205 || 45 || 35 || 0.1 || 0.0 || 9.9 || 10.6 || 20.5 || 4.5 || 3.5
|- class="sortbottom"
! colspan=3| Career
! 61
! 11
! 10
! 576
! 527
! 1103
! 259
! 172
! 0.2
! 0.2
! 9.4
! 8.6
! 18.1
! 4.2
! 2.8
|}

References

External links

1987 births
Living people
Melbourne Football Club players
Australian rules footballers from Victoria (Australia)
Box Hill Football Club players
Casey Demons players